James Boyles Murray (November 6, 1789 – February 14, 1866) was a businessman and leading member of New York society in the early-to-mid-19th century.

Early life
Murray was born to a wealthy immigrant family in Alexandria, Virginia on November 6, 1789.  He was the son of Martha (née McClenahan) Murray and Dr. John Boyles Murray, who moved to Virginia in 1760.

His paternal grandfather was Sir James Murray, Lord Philiphaugh.  His Presbyterian lineage was descended from the royal Stewarts through the ubiquitous clan of Murray.  His mother's family, that of Martha McClenahan, had been associated with the history of the Siege of Derry.  Rev. McClenahan had been one of the Apprentice Boys supporters, when they marched out to meet King James army.

In 1800, when only a boy, Murray went to Norfolk, England, and caught a glimpse of the hero Admiral Nelson touring through his home city of Norwich.  When only a small boy he had been warned of his Scots ancestry.  He toured Philiphaugh, Scotland.  He never forgot the supremacy of the seas of the Royal Navy, and vowed to help the President build a strong US Navy.

Career
James was an early entrant in the New York Militia, replacing his gun-shy uncle in the War of 1812.  Murray's service was distinguished and intelligent.  Through his impressive revolutionary connections he rose quickly to become a Colonel.

He was very business-minded and commercially astute.  He joined in partnership with the big financier Isaac Bronson, one of the founders of sound credit in public finance.  As a result of the reflective determination of this close group to expand bank facility to construction of the American Empire, he borrowed heavily to finance the greatest canal construction project in history.  The Erie Canal was an immense feat of ingenuity partly funded by the Bronson family bankers.

In politics, Murray was a friend of the Democratic-Republicans of the Albany Regency. Their leading character, De Witt Clinton, had been involved in scandal. But the successor, Martin Van Buren, proved both clever and honest. In 1816 Murray joined the staff of Vice-President candidate Daniel Tompkins, the Governor.  Murray's role was to act as bodyguard and protector of the V-P.  Then one day on the Chesapeake half of President Tyler's cabinet was blown sky high.  Murray's political ambitions ended there and then.

Murray resolved to become a good business investor in land speculations and construction projects.  He continued to do business with the Bronson sons.  He became involved in rather dubious Rutherford Land Grab of 1834 in the Carolinas, but was not convicted.  He was also in a partnership that invested extensively in the 'Ohio Country' as far west as Chicago and Kalamazoo.

In later life Murray made extensive business trips to France and England.  He was particularly pleased with Paris where his daughter married the American Impressionist painter, William Dana.  Murray went on tour to Scotland and visited the high society circles of London.  His public appearances attracted fees.  Murray deplored the outbreak of the Civil War in 1861, the duration of which he spent in New York City.

Personal life
In 1814, he married Maria Bronson (1793–1851), the eldest surviving daughter of Isaac Bronson (1760–1838), founder of New York Assurance Company and Bridgeport Bank at Park Place in New York City, and sister of Oliver Bronson.  In 1828, Bronson was the richest man in New York.  Murray was at the height of polite New York society and purchased a house at the fashionable Manhattan address of Washington Square Park.  Together, they were the parents of eight children, including:

 Maria Murray (1815–1884), who married at Greenfield Hill, Connecticut, in 1846.
 Bronson Murray (1816–1911), who married Ann Eliza Peyton (b. 1821) in 1848.
 John Boyles Murray (1818–1889), who married Sarah Elizabeth Craft (1823–1869) in 1843.  After her death, he married Felicia May Leiss, the daughter of Dr. Frederic Leiss.
 Caroline Murray (1820–1889), who died unmarried.
 Agnes Augusta Murray (1827–1878)
 Washington Murray (1828–1867), a Yale and Harvard Law School graduate who married Eliza Bradlee Winchester Dana (b. 1835), sister of William Dana in 1856.
 Anna Bronson Murray (1831–1915), who married William Parsons Winchester Dana (1833–1927) in 1855.

Murray died in 1866 at 4 Washington Place, New York City.  His family was later related to William Cutting (of Gangs of New York fame).  Some of Murray's correspondence is held by the New-York Historical Society.

References

External links
 James Boyle Murray at WorldCat
 Murray, Col. James B., Autobiography published 1866

1789 births
1866 deaths
19th-century American people
American militiamen in the War of 1812
American militia officers